Morgen was an American psychedelic rock band formed in Long Island. Their only album, Morgen, was released in 1969, and is considered one of the best heavy American psychedelic rock albums of the 1960s. The first track off of this album, "Welcome To The Void", includes several references to fairy tales and folklore, including Jack Be Nimble and Peter Pan.

Morgen was founded in 1967 by Steve Morgen, Bobby Rizzo, Murray Schiffrin, Mike Ratti, and Barry Stock. Originally, the band was named "Morgen’s Dreame Spectrum" but was later changed to simply "Morgen".

Musical groups from Long Island
Psychedelic rock music groups from New York (state)